The Western Front Association (WFA) was inaugurated on 11 November 1980, in order to further interest in the Great War of 1914-1918. The WFA aims to perpetuate the memory, courage and comradeship of all those who fought on all sides and who served their countries during the Great War. The Western Front Association does not seek to justify or glorify war. It is not a reenactment society, nor is it commercially motivated. It is entirely non-political. The object of the Association is to educate the public in the history of The Great War with particular reference to the Western Front.

The WFA was established by military historian John Giles, who enlisted the help of the historian John Terraine, who co-wrote the landmark television series The Great War, which was first broadcast by the BBC in 1964. Giles was driven to form The Western Front Association as a result of the creation of such groups as 'The Gallipoli Association' which had been established in 1969, and, in the early 1970s the 'Waterloo Association' which had been set up to save the old battlefield. It was in this context, over the following years, that John Giles developed the idea for an association on the First World War with its emphasis on the Western Front. It would be, John Giles was clear, 'The Western Front' and not, in his words about 'Salonica or Naval battles; - the definitive article 'The' was also stipulated. And thus in November 1980 The Western Front Association was established.

Since its foundation the WFA has grown over the years to in excess of 6,000 members worldwide. There are around 60 branches in the UK, Europe, USA, Canada, Australia and New Zealand. The WFA also now recognises all theatres of war and fronts covering every aspect of British and global history at this time. 

The Western Front Association is a UK registered charity, numbered 298365.

Website
The website of The Western Front Association is a hub for this educational charity: content and resources included many hundreds of articles, book reviews and podcasts, as well as member login access to 8.4 million digitised Pension Records, archived journals and magazines, including the entire 40+ year archive of the WFA's own journal 'Stand To!' and member magazine 'Bulletin'. Further resources include a vast collection of thousands of stereoview photographs, a collection of 12 virtual battlefield tours and the WFA's TrenchMapper App which allows the user to identify locations along the Western Front using maps of the period and overlay these with a modern map.

Branches
With nearly sixty branches worldwide, including fifty in the UK and Ireland, the WFA has a representation in most counties in the UK and in most of 'main combatant' countries which took part in the Great War. 

Membership of the WFA is not a requisite to attend branch meetings, which are open to the public. There are no formal charges for attending these meetings, but a donation on the door is usually requested, this is typically between £3 and £5. Most branches hold an event at least once a month, so there are between 500 and 600 meetings up and down the UK every year in which an aspect of the Great War is discussed.

Publications
The WFA publishes its journal, 'Stand To!' four times a year. This contains articles on the military and social history of The Great War on all fronts globally: at sea, in the air, on land and a thome. There is also a house magazine for members, the 'Bulletin', which is also published three times each year. An electronic newsletter 'Trench Lines' is also available produced. In addition there are over 250 podcasts 'Mentioned in Dispatches' and on the WFA YouTube channel many hundreds of videos - often carefully produced recordings of webinars and in-person lectures.

Videos
The Western Front Association has for many years made videos of lectures held at its events, as well as making a short film of the Armistice Day event at the Cenotaph, Whitehall every 11th November. There are now several hundred videos available. During the Covid 19 Pandemic a series of regular online talks were initiated, sometimes meeting twice a week during this period - as a result there is now a large, readily accessed collection of video talks on The Western Front Association's YouTube channel. As these online talks were so successful they have continued to feature regularly, usually on a Monday evening two or more times a month.

Annual Service of Remembrance
The WFA organises each year the Remembrance ceremony held at the Cenotaph in Whitehall, London on 11 November (except when the 11th falls on Remembrance Sunday). The 2014 ceremony was attended by the Prime Minister, David Cameron.

First World War records saved

Medal Index Cards
The Medal Index Cards were saved from destruction in 2005. Medal Index Cards (MICs) are the original method of recording medal entitlement for soldiers who served in the Great War. Each soldier who served in an active theatre of operations was awarded a medal.

The Medal Index Cards were stored at the Ministry of Defence record centre in Hayes until 2005. Due to the need to make space, the MoD sold the Hayes site for redevelopment; the MoD (which owned the cards) proposed the cards would be destroyed. No museum or archive was prepared to take them on, so the Western Front Association came forward and agreed to save these records.

Since obtaining these cards, the WFA has been storing them. Many WFA members have requested copies of these, often placing the card in a frame alongside the medals.

Pension Index Cards and Ledgers

In November 2012, the WFA announced that it has secured over six million Pension Index Cards and Ledgers from the UK's Ministry of Defence, which would otherwise have been destroyed. These are an extremely valuable primary source for family and military historians as they provide information on men (and some women) who served in the Great War and who subsequently applied for a pension. This significantly adds to the data that is available, particularly for those individuals who survived the Great War.

Sound archives at the Imperial War Museum

The Imperial War Museum's sound archive holds over 33,000 recordings relating to conflict since 1914. This consists of the largest oral history collection of its type in the world, with contributions from both service personnel and non-combatants as well as significant holdings of speeches, sound effects, broadcasts, poetry and music.  The Western Front Association funded digitisation of the majority of IWM's First World War sound recordings, thereby widening public access to this important historical resource.

Tours
The Western Front Association organises tours of the battlefields for its members three times a year. Many of the WFA's branches organise similar tours at a local level.

Honorary office holders

Patrons:
Prof. Hew Strachan FRSE, FRHistS 
Professor Peter Simkins MBE FRHistS

Honorary President:
Professor Gary Sheffield BA MA PhD FRHistS 

Honorary Vice Presidents:

 Professor John Bourne BA PhD FRHistS The Burgomaster of Ypres The Mayor of Albert Col (Rtd) Patrick M Dennis OMM Lt. Col. (Rtd) Christopher Pugsley DPhil FRHistS Dr Roger V. Lee PhD jssc Major-General (ret'd) Mungo Melvin CB OBE Dr Jack Sheldon MA PhD FRGSDr Spencer Jones

Past Patrons:

Sir John Glubb KCB, CMG, DSO, OBE, MC John Terraine FRHist.  Colonel Terry Cave, C.B.E.  

Past Presidents:

John Terraine FRHist.SCorrelli Barnett C.B.E., D.Sc., MA, F.R.S.I, F.R. Hist..S., F.R.S.A.

Past Vice Presidents: The Earl Kitchener TD, DL Tony Noyes CEng MICE  John TolandThe Prince Albrecht, Duke of BavariaGeneral Sir Anthony Farrar-Hockley, GBE, KCB, DSO, MCThe Earl Haig, OBE, KStJ, DLCol Terry Cave CBE Leonard G. Shurtleff  André Coillot.

References

External links
Western Front Association, The (1980-date). "Stand To!, The Journal of the Western Front Association".  "Bulletin, Members in house magazine of The Western Front Association" 
The National Archives, UK. Soldiers and Genealogy Your Archives
University of Oxford, UK. The First World War Digital Poetry Archive: Western Front Websites
 Imperial War Museum
 Centre for First World War Studies, University of Birmingham
 The Great War
 History Today
 The Charity Commission
 The Commonwealth War Graves Commission
 The Guardian

World War I
Military-related organizations
Educational charities based in the United Kingdom